The 1962 World 600, the 3rd running of the event, was a NASCAR Grand National Series race held on May 27, 1962 at Charlotte Motor Speedway in Charlotte, North Carolina. Contested over 400 laps on the 1.5 mile (2.4 km) speedway, it was the 23rd race of the 1962 NASCAR Grand National Series season.

Background
Charlotte Motor Speedway is a motorsports complex located in Concord, North Carolina, United States, 13 miles from Charlotte, North Carolina. The complex features a 1.5 miles (2.4 km) quad oval track that hosts NASCAR racing including the prestigious World 600 on Memorial Day weekend and the National 400. The speedway was built in 1959 by Bruton Smith and is considered the home track for NASCAR with many race teams located in the Charlotte area. The track is owned and operated by Speedway Motorsports Inc. (SMI).

Race report
Nelson Stacy won the race over the second-place Joe Weatherly by a time of 32.35 seconds; making his third race victory of out a total of four. The race lasted four hours, forty-six minutes, and forty-four seconds. Two cautions slowed the race for 14 laps. Eighteen lead changes were recorded during the race.

David Pearson was leading with seven laps to go. It was an extremely hot day and Pearson said it was hard to see because he had to wipe the sweat from his head on the straightaway. While leading with seven laps to go, his car just quit on him. He said it was one of the most disappointing losses of his career.

Red Foote would make his NASCAR debut in this race while Gerald Duke and Herb Tillman would retire from professional stock car racing after this event. Joe Weatherly's respectable second-place finish managed to boost him ahead of Jack Smith in the championship standings.

Notable crew chiefs for this race; included Bud Moore, Herman Beam, Glen Wood, Herb Nab and Ratus Walters.

Final Results

References

World 600
World 600
NASCAR races at Charlotte Motor Speedway
World 600